Trần Chánh Thành (9 July 1917 – 30 April 1975) was a South Vietnamese diplomat and politician who served as Deputy Prime Minister of the State of Vietnam under Prime Minister Ngô Đình Diệm from 1954 to 1955. After the establishment of the Republic of Vietnam, he would go on to serve in South Vietnam's first President Ngô Đình Diệm's government as the Minister of Information and the  Minister of Foreign Affairs of South Vietnam under the premiership of Prime Minister Trần Văn Hương.

Early life
Thành was born in Hanoi, Tonkin, French Indochina and raised in central Vietnam in the capital of Huế where his father Trần Đức served as a foreign language interpreter for the Emperor Khải Định. As a child, Thành excelled in his studies, after graduating from high school in Huế, he went to study at the University of Hanoi, earning a LL.B. in law.

Career
After graduating from university, he initially joined the Viet Minh in fighting for Vietnamese independence. However, he grew disenfranchised with the Viet Minh after witnessing them being more dedicated to Communism than Nationalism and committing heinous and cunning acts, he left. After leaving the Viet Minh, he joined the law firm of Lawyer Trương Đình Dzu. 

During the premiership of Prime Minister Ngô Đình Diệm he was invited to assume the role of Deputy Prime Minister of the State of Vietnam, serving from 1954 to 1955. In 1955, Ngô Đình Diệm led a referendum ousting the Head of State Bảo Đại, with Diệm declaring himself as President of the newly established government of South Vietnam. Diệm personally invited Thành to serve as the Minister of Information, a position which Thành served until 1962. In early November 1963, a coup led by General Dương Văn Minh, resulted in the overthrow and assassination of Ngô Đình Diệm made Thành briefly withdraw from politics. He made his political comeback in 1967, after being electing as a member of the senate in the National Assembly. The following year he was invited by Prime Minister Trần Văn Hương to serve as Minister of Foreign Affairs of South Vietnam. When the premiership of Trần Văn Hương ended, Thành retired from politics.

After a stunt in politics, he went on teach journalism at the École des Dessins until the Fall of Saigon.

Fall of Saigon
On 30 April 1975 Thành and his family were promised to be evacuated by the French however the evacuation did  not happen as it was too late as the forces of the People's Army of Vietnam and Vietcong were closing in on Saigon. As a result, he committed suicide in his home by overdosing on medicine pills in protest of the Communist North Vietnamese take over of South Vietnam.

References

South Vietnamese politicians
1975 deaths
1917 births
People from Hanoi